Bactropaltis is a genus of moth in the family Gelechiidae. It contains the species Bactropaltis lithosema, which is found in the Central African Republic.

References

Gelechiinae
Taxa named by Edward Meyrick
Moth genera